The Brothers (Da di shuang ying in Mandarin), is a Kung Fu film which was also released in the United States under the title The Kung Fu Brothers.

References

External links 
 

Hong Kong martial arts films
1973 films
Chinese martial arts films
Kung fu films
1970s Hong Kong films